Air Vice Marshal (retd.) Mumtaz Uddin Ahmed is a former chief of Bangladesh Air Force.

Career
Ahmed was commissioned in the PAF on 22 June 1963 in the 36th GD(P) Course. He started his career in 1963 as a F-86 fighter pilot in the No. 11, 5 and 23 Squadron of the Pakistan Air Force based in West Pakistan. He made active participation in the 1965 INDO-PAK War and was decorated for gallantry. He was a Squadron Leader posted at Sargodha Airbase at the time of the Liberation War and was kept as a prisoner of war in Pakistan until 1974. He was a top gun in MIG21 aircraft in the USSR. In the BAF he served as an OC of Flying Wing, DC of BAF Academy, Base Commander, Director of Operations and ACAS at the Air Force Headquarters.  He was the chief of Bangladesh Air Force from 23 July 1987 to 4 June 1991. He retired on 4 June 1991.
Mumtaz Uddin Ahmed died at the age of 75 in Dhaka CMH on 22 September 2019.

References

 

Living people
Bangladesh Air Force air marshals
Chiefs of Air Staff (Bangladesh)
1944 births
PAF College Sargodha alumni